The Indian Railway Traffic Service, abbreviated as IRTS is a Prestigious Group 'A' Central Civil Service Cadre of the Government of India. IRTS in its present form was reconstituted in 1967. The IRTS Cadre functions under the Administrative Control of the Ministry of Railways, Government of India. The civil servants under this service are responsible for Operation and Business Development of Indian Railways in the country. On one hand, IRTS officers co-ordinate among various technical departments of the Indian Railways, while on the other hand, they form the public interface of the Indian Railways. Colloquially called Traffic Officers, they are the primary facilitators of Railway services right from Planning of freight movement, Passenger transport, Passenger amenities to Station Management and Infrastructure Planning.

Traffic Department is responsible for optimum utilization of Railway assets and their seamless integration to provide a swift and safe transportation service and consequent realization of revenues in-line with the social obligations of the Indian Railways.

Traffic Department comprises two branches:
 Operations - deals with rail passenger and freight train logistics
 Commercial - deals with revenue earnings of railways
Officers may be shifted from one branch to another based on organisational requirements throughout their career.

History 
With the growing network and increasing traffic, the British Govt. recognized the need for a separate Traffic Department for handling train operations. The Traffic Service was created in the year in 1889 that was further strengthened in 1906. Earlier, an exclusive service reserved for English officers, admission into the cadre was thrown open to all post-Independence.

Initially known as "Officers of the Superior Revenue Establishment of the Traffic, Transportation and Commercial Department of Indian Railways", the service, on 4 March 1967 was rechristened  "Indian Railway Traffic Service".

The logo 
The redesigned logo prominently features the following components
 Ashok stambh in gold.
 Pair of hands strongly holding up the Chakra signifying moving the nation towards prosperity and development.
A logo to represent the legacy of IRTS while highlighting its role in nation building in the times to come.

Recruitment
There are two modes of recruitment to IRTS Group 'A' : 
 50% through direct recruitment through the annual Civil Services Examination conducted by UPSC. 
 50% through promotion from Group B officers of Operating and Commercial departments of the Zonal Railways.
Current cadre strength of IRTS officers is around 900, serving in 68 divisions across 17 Zonal Railways in India and the Railway Board

Training 
After selection, the IRTS probationers undergo Foundation training at Lal Bahadur Shastri National Academy of Administration (LBSNAA), along with trainees of IAS, IPS and other Civil Services.

IRTS probationers then report to their Centralized Training Institute (CTI) - Indian Railways Institute for Transportation Management, Lucknow (IRITM)  for joining formalities and induction into the cadre as Officer Trainees or Probationary Officers. This is followed by visit to a host of academies and institutions, over a period of next 78 weeks, to give wide-ranging exposure to officer trainees which would be useful in their career as railway officers. Some of these institutions include-

 Operations and Commercial Training at Indian Railways Institute for Transport Management, Lucknow (IRITM) 
 Railway Foundation Course at National Academy of Indian Railway (NAIR), Vadodara. 
 Operations Training at Zonal Railway Training Institute (ZRTI), Udaipur
 Marketing Management and Transport Economics at Indian Institute of Management (IIM)
 Operations Research at Indian Institute of Technology (IIT)
 Tourism and Hospitality management Training at Indian Railway Catering and Tourism Corporation (IRCTC)
 Vigilance and Anti-Corruption Training at Central Bureau of Investigation (CBI) Academy, Ghaziabad  
 Accounts Training at Centralised Training Academy for Railway Accounts (C-TARA), Secundarabad
 Secretariat Training at Institute for Secretariat Training and Management (ISTM), New Delhi
 Ethical Governance Training at  Initiatives of Change (IofC), Panchgani
 Accounts Training at National Academy Of Audit and Accounts (NAAA), Shimla
 Metro Rail Training at Delhi Metro Rail Corporation (DMRC), New Delhi
 Military Logistics Training at Sena Bhavan, New Delhi
 Appreciation program at Indian Military Academy (IMA), Dehradun
 Container Logistics Training at Inland Container Depot (ICD), Tughlaqabad
 Signals and Tele-communications Training at Indian Railways Institute of Signal Engineering and Telecommunications (IRISET), Secundarabad
P-Way, Works and Contract Management Training at Indian Railways Institute of Civil Engineering (IRICEN), Pune
 Locomotive, Rolling Stock and Workshop Management Training at Indian Railways Institute of Mechanical and Electrical Engineering (IRIMEE), Jamalpur
 Electric Traction and Railway Electrification Management Training at Indian Railways Institute of Electrical Engineering (IRIEEN), Nashik
 Infrastructure Security Management Training at Jagjivan Ram Railway Protection Force Academy (JRRPF), Lucknow
 Railway Information Infrastructure Management Training at Centre for Railway information systems (CRIS), New Delhi
 Parliamentary Procedures Training at Bureau of Parliamentary Studies and Training (BPST), New Delhi
 Divisional attachments at 68 divisions spread across the length and breadth of the country
Industrial Field visits – Coal India, Aditya Birla Cements, TATA, Bhilai Steel Plant
Port Attachments – Paradip, Vishakhapatnam, JNPT, Mangalore, Krishnapatnam, Ennore etc.
 Appreciation Visits to various Railway establishments situated in difficult terrains – Konkan Railways, K-K Line, Shimla-Kalka Toy Train, Nilgiri Railway, Udhampur-Srinagar, Pamban Bridge
 Appreciation program at Indira Gandhi National Forest Academy (IGNFA), Dehradun
 Appreciation program at Forest Research Institute (FRI), Dehradun
 Appreciation program at Wildlife Institute of India (WII), Dehradun
 Foreign attachment with Deutsche Bahn and Siemens Mobility in Germany

Role and function
The role of an IRTS officer in the Operations Department is that of ensuring efficient, safe and user friendly transportation of freight and passengers. He/She ensures optimum utilization of railway's assets by maximizing output with available inputs. This is achieved by coordinating with the service departments looking after various assets of railways like track, wagons, engines, signals, etc. He/She combines the outputs of the various departments maintaining the assets – rolling stock and fixed infrastructure to produce a service output – passenger or freight transport. This is done through the Control Office, which is said to be the nerve center of Railways, under the direct superintendence of IRTS officers posted in Operations Department.

In the Commercial Department, an IRTS officer is responsible for revenue realization for various services offered by Indian Railways. The commercial department reviews past sales and profit performance; assess the potential of the railways for improved performance and traffic growth, relative to competitors; develop a program of action to achieve projected growth in traffic; define or re-define marketing objectives; specify sales, pricing and promotional strategies to increase traffic; and establish methods and systems to monitor performance.  The department is also concerned with provisioning of passenger amenities and re-dressal of customer complaints. Various passenger amenities in Railway Stations and Trains, like catering, stalls on the Railway Stations, services in trains and stations etc. come under the superintendence of IRTS Officers working in the Commercial Department.

Being the first point of contact with the Rail users they are the agents of change in the Railway system by conveying user expectations. The information technology requirement of passenger ticketing and freight realization is also managed by IRTS officers in the zonal headquarters in association with the Centre for Railway Information Systems (CRIS).

The role changes depending on where an officer is placed in the organization – 
 Division (Operational level) - Real action in terms of implementation of policies occur here
 Zone (Tactical level) - Collation of Data, chasing of targets 
 Railway Board (Strategic level) - Policy making and National Priorities of Railways vis-à-vis industries and other modes of transport
IRTS officers go for Deputation in various ministries of Government of India. They are particularly sought after for their exceptional work ethic and result oriented functioning. IRTS officers are also preferred in projects related to infrastructure and marshaling of technical resources.

The opening up of Indian economy has brought a paradigm shift in the role of IRTS officers – from rail transport to logistics'. They have been instrumental in raising the earnings of Indian Railways through efficient freight movement and improved passenger transport which are conducted 24x7 non-stop.

Organizational structure

Generally, direct recruit officers are appointed in the Operations Department. They can also be posted in Indian Railway's major Railway Yards & Areas where they look after both Operations and Commercial aspects. In the present context, IRTS officers have better promotional avenues in initial stages among other Central Services. Also, due to Selection Grade being non-functional in Railways, all Railway Officers remain field level executives for relatively longer periods of time which make them quite effective at policy making.

 Challenges and opportunities 

Movement of trains in a country as vast, diverse and dynamic as India poses a lot of challenges. Solving these challenges in real-time by coordinating with various department of railways, district authorities, society at large and business entities requires acumen for problem solving and knack for optimization. It is the foremost responsibility of IRTS Officers that the wheel on the rail must not come to a halt.

Railway transportation, being the most energy efficient and convenient over large distances is going to see increased patronization, by passengers and businesses alike, in the coming decades. Movement of this increased traffic over vast but capacity constrained Indian Railway network is going to be challenging for IRTS Officers to organize

 Distinguished officers 

 Shri. V.N Mathur 
Shri Vinoo Narain Mathur was honored as distinguished alumnus on 66th foundation day of NAIR. He is from IRTS 1971 batch and in his illustrious career of 36 years on Railways, besides other responsibilities, he worked as senior professor Mgt./NAIR, DRM/Dhanbad, secretary Railway Board, GM/NR and finally member traffic. He made significant contributions to railway working in various capacities. After superannuation, he guided Bharuch-Dahez rail Corporation Ltd. From 2009 to 2014. Presently, he is member and senior advisor to Japan International Consultation Agency for transport and contributing to the construction of first high speed corridor between Mumbai and Ahmedabad.

 Shri Shyamal Ghosh Dastidar 

Shri Shyamal Ghosh Dastidar belongs to 1969 batch of IRTS Officers. He has been an officer, who always successfully experimented with new ideas and innovation into the system, and benefited the organisation immensely. He served in various capacities, which included Sr. DOM/Dhanbad division, DRM/Bilaspur division, COM/South Central Railway and GM/Central Railway. Working as Member Traffic from 2005 to 2007, he made exemplary contributions in the turnaround of economic status of the organisation. He also led the development of work for preparing the blueprint for dedicated freight corridors.

For his tireless and innovating efforts for the development of railway business and economy of the country, Shri Ghosh Dastidar was honoured with the title Padmashree.

 Shri Ajay Shukla 
Shri Shukla is a senior officer of 1979 batch of Indian Railway Traffic Service. He has held important positions in the Indian Railways, like chief passenger traffic manager and chief safety officer, Northern Railway; Divisional Railway Manger, Dhanbad, East Central Railway; chief operations manager, North Western Railway and South East Central Railway; additional general manager, East Central Railway.

He started writing short articles in Hindi as well as in English since college time and more than 100 articles written by him were published in various magazines and newspapers during college/university period between 1973 and 1978. Some of the books in English authored by Shri Shukla include (i) Silent Raindrop – Collection of poetry, (ii) Philosophy of Bhagvada Gita, and (iii) Four Lane Expressway to Stress Management and Happiness and some of popular books written by him in Hindi are: Taj Mahal ka Tender (Play), Doosra Adhyay (Play) and Pratibodh (1977) (Poem) and Prashnchihan (Collection of poems). He won Sahitya Kala Parishad National Award for his play Doosra Adhyaya, Mohan Rakesh Samman by Sahitya Kala Parishad for his play Taj Mahal Ka Tender and National Award by All India Radio (Akashvani 2000) for Play Hum Hongey Kaamyaab. Shri Shukla has many e-books to his credit which include (i) Yoga-Karma to Nirvana,(ii) Awakening, (iii) Silent Raindrops, (iv) Muddle Management (v) My Life; as a Ghost and (vi) Four Lane Expressway to Stress Management and Happiness.

 Shri Vinay Mittal 

A 1975 Batch Indian Railway Traffic Service (IRTS) officer, Shri Vinay Mittal, was the chairman, Railway Board (CRB) and ex officio principal secretary to the Government of India till 30 June 2013. During his long career spanning 38 years, Shri Mittal held various key positions in the Indian Railways.

As chairman, Railway Board, Shri Mittal also held the position of ex officio chairman of the Dedicated Freight Corridor Corporation of India Ltd (DFCCIL), which has been set up for constructing the two iconic high technology freight corridors of over 3000 km on the Eastern and Western flanks of the country being attempted on a scale of this magnitude for the first time in India.

He was appointed member, UPSC on 8 August 2013

Shri Vinay Mittal has been appointed chairman of the Union Public Service Commission (UPSC) on 22 January 2018.

Shrimati Ananda Shankar Jayant

Ananda Shankar Jayant is an Indian classical dancer, choreographer, scholar and bureaucrat, known for her proficiency in the classical dance forms of Bharatanatyam and Kuchipudi. She is the first woman officer in the Indian Railway Traffic Service on South Central Railway  and her 2009 TED talk is ranked among the top twelve Incredible TED talks on cancer''.

See also 
 Scope of Railway Transport
2000 Batch IRTS Officer appointed CVO of CBSE under Ministry of Human Resource Development
IRTS Officers pens "Break-up" song for U.P based film
 Future prospects for IRTS officers in the Private sector
 Present role and future of IRTS by IRTS Association
 IRTS Officers appointed chairmen of Major Port Trusts

References

External links
 Indian Railways official Website
 Indian Railways Institute of Transport Management
 IRTS Association Website
 Indian Railway Fan Club Association
 Serving IRTS Officers

Central Civil Services (India)
T